Munjik Tirmidhi was a Persian poet who is best known for his satirical poems. A native of the city of Tirmidh, he served as a panegyrist of the local Muhtajid dynasty of Chaghaniyan.

References

Sources 
 

10th-century Persian-language poets
Year of birth unknown
Year of death unknown
10th-century Iranian people
Panegyrists
People from Surxondaryo Region